Gottfried Taubert (baptized 30 Juli 1670-died July 6, 1746) was a German dance master of the Baroque period.

Life 
Taubert was born in Ronneburg, Thuringia, the son of Christoph Tauber[t] and of Anna Brämmer. He attended lectures at Leipzig University from 1686 and from 1693. Until 1695, he studied in the fair city. In 1702, he settled in Danzig, but returned to Leipzig in 1715, where he published his extensive dance book Rechtschaffener Tanzmeister in 1717. It also contains the first German translation of the French Choreography by Raoul-Auger Feuillet as well as the instructions of the dances after Raoul-Auger Feuillet and Louis Pécour. From about 1730 until his death, he was court dance master in Zerbst.

Taubert may have exerted the most lasting influence among German dance book authors. It is ultimately the most comprehensive record of the German reception of Baroque French dance. Tilden Russell brought out an English translation of this work in 2012, providing it with an introductory volume built on extensive preliminary studies. At the beginning of the 18th century, Leipzig was virtually a "stronghold of the academic art of dance", as Walter Salmen called it...). Taubert played a big part in making this happen.

Taubert died in Zerbst at the age of 75.

Work

References

Further reading 
 
 Giles Bennett: Taubert, Gottfried. In Ludwig Finscher (e.): Die Musik in Geschichte und Gegenwart. Second edition, Personal part, vol.16 (Strata – Villoteau).
 Angelika Renate Gerbes: Gottfried Taubert on social and theatrical dance of the early eighteenth century. Diss. Ann Arbor 1972.
 Angelika Renate Gerbes: Eighteenth Century Dance Instruction: The Course of Study Advocated by Gottfried Taubert. In Dance Research: The Journal of Society of Dance Research, Vol. 10, No. 1 (April 1992), .
 Michael Maul: Barockoper in Leipzig (1693–1720): Textband (Rombach Wissenschaft Reihe Voces. Vol. 12/1). Rombach, Freiburg/Berlin/Vienna 2009, .
 Konstanze Musketa: „daß ein rechtschaffener Tantzmeister müsse ein guter Musicus seyn“: Anmerkungen zum Wirken des Tanzmeisters Gottfried Taubert (1670–1746). In Zerbst zur Zeit Faschs – ein anhaltinischer Musenhof. Bericht über die internationale wissenschaftliche Konferenz am 17. und 18. April 2015 im Rahmen der 13. Internationalen Fasch-Festtage in Zerbst/Anhalt. ortus, Beeskow 2015, .
 Walter Salmen: Der Tanzmeister. Geschichte und Profil eines Berufes vom 14. bis zum 19. Jahrhundert. Mit dem Anhang „Der Tanzmeister in der Literatur“. Olms, Hildesheim/Zürich/New York 1997, .
 Stephanie Schroedter: Vom „Affect zur Action“: Quellenstudien zur Poetik der Tanzkunst vom späten Ballet de Cour bis zum frühen Ballet en Action. Königshausen und Neumann, Würzburg 2004, pp. 75f.
 Mario Todte: Fecht-, Reit- und Tanzmeister an der Universität Leipzig (Studien zur Kultur und Geschichte. vol. 1). Via Regia, Bernstadt a. d. Eigen 2016, .
 Hanna Walsdorf, Marie-Thérèse Mourey, Tilden Russell (ed.): Tauberts "Rechtschaffener Tantzmeister" (Leipzig 1717): Kontexte – Lektüren – Praktiken (Cadences – Schriften zur Tanz- und Musikgeschichte. Vol. 2). Frank & Timme, Berlin 2019, .

External links 

 
 Gottfried Taubert on DDB person.
 Taubert (Tauber), Gottfried (Gottfriedt) on BMLO
 Symposium ehrt barocken Tanzmeister Gottfried Taubert
 Interdisziplinäres Symposium vom 20. bis 23 September 2017 of the Leipzig University.

German choreographers
German male essayists
1670 births
1746 deaths
People from Thuringia